The 1974 Oregon gubernatorial election took place on November 5, 1974. Democratic nominee Robert Straub, endorsed by the outgoing governor Tom McCall, defeated Republican nominee Victor Atiyeh.

Candidates

Democratic
 Robert W. Straub, former Oregon State Treasurer
 Betty Roberts, state senator
 James A. Redden, Oregon State Treasurer

Republican
 Victor G. Atiyeh, state representative
 H. Clay Myers Jr., Oregon Secretary of State

Election results

References

1974
Gubernatorial
Oregon
November 1974 events in the United States